Molló (Catalan for "milestone") is a town and municipality in the comarca of Ripollès in Girona, Catalonia, Spain, located in the Pyrenees, by the French border. Molló borders to the north with Prats de Molló (in Vallespir, France, connected by the Coll d'Ares pass of the Pyrenees), to the east and south with Camprodon, and to the west with Llanars and Setcases.

References

External links
 Government data pages 

Municipalities in Ripollès
France–Spain border crossings